The sphenoparietal suture is the cranial suture between the sphenoid bone and the parietal bone. It is one of the sutures that comprises the pterion.

Additional images

References

External links

Bones of the head and neck
Cranial sutures
Human head and neck
Joints
Joints of the head and neck
Skeletal system
Skull